Review: Literature and Arts of the Americas is a biannual peer-reviewed academic journal that was established in 1968. It covers contemporary Latin American, Caribbean, and Canadian writing in English and English translation as well as the visual and performing arts in the Americas. The journal is published by Routledge in association with The City College of New York, CUNY.

Editors-in-chief
Editors-in-chief have included Ronald Christ, Alfred Mac Adam, and Doris Sommer. The current editor-in-chief is Daniel Shapiro.

Abstracting and indexing
The journal is abstracted and indexed in the Arts & Humanities Citation Index, Current Contents/Arts & Humanities, EBSCO databases, Film Literature Index, Hispanic American Periodicals Index, MLA International Bibliography, RILM Abstracts of Music Literature, and Scopus.

References

External links

Routledge academic journals
Publications established in 1968
Biannual journals
English-language journals
Arts journals
Literary magazines published in the United States